MGM Growth Properties LLC (MGP) was a real estate investment trust based in Summerlin South, Nevada, that invested in large-scale casino properties. The company had whole or majority ownership of 15 properties, all of which were operated by MGM Resorts International. The company leased the properties to MGM Resorts via triple-net leases. The company was acquired by Vici Properties in April 2022 for $17.2 billion.

History
The company was formed on October 23, 2015.

On April 25, 2016, the company became a public company via an initial public offering and acquired The Mirage, Mandalay Bay, Luxor Las Vegas, New York-New York Hotel and Casino, Monte Carlo Resort and Casino, Excalibur Hotel and Casino, The Park, Gold Strike Tunica, MGM Grand Detroit, and Beau Rivage from MGM Resorts International.

On August 1, 2016, the company acquired the real estate assets related to the Borgata Hotel Casino and Spa from MGM.

In September 2017, the company acquired MGM National Harbor for $1.2 billion.

In July 2018, MGP bought Northfield Park, a racino in Ohio, for $1.02 billion. Hard Rock International remained as the property's manager. In January 2019, the company bought another racino, Yonkers Raceway & Empire City Casino, for $625 million, and leased it to MGM Resorts.
In April 2019, MGM Resorts bought Northfield's operating business from MGM Growth for $275 million in stock, assumed control from Hard Rock, and rebranded the property as MGM Northfield Park. MGM Resorts leased the property from MGM Growth for initial rent of $60 million per year.

In February 2020, MGP formed a joint venture with the Blackstone Real Estate Income Trust to own the real estate of Mandalay Bay and MGM Grand Las Vegas. The joint venture paid $2.1 billion to MGP for Mandalay Bay, and $2.4 billion to MGM Resorts for the MGM Grand. MGP took 50.1 percent ownership of the joint venture.

In May 2021, MGP agreed to buy the real estate of MGM Springfield from MGM Resorts for $400 million. The property would be leased back to MGM Resorts for initial rent of $30 million per year.

In August 2021, MGP agreed to be acquired by Vici Properties for $17.2 billion (consisting of $4.4 billion of cash, $5.7 billion of assumed debt, and the remainder in stock). The sale was completed on April 29th, 2022.

Properties
The properties owned by MGM Growth Properties at the time of its acquisition were:
 Beau Rivage
 Borgata Hotel Casino and Spa
 Excalibur Hotel and Casino
 Gold Strike Tunica
 Luxor Las Vegas
 Mandalay Bay (50.1% stake)
 MGM Grand Detroit
 MGM Grand Las Vegas (50.1% stake)
 MGM National Harbor 
 MGM Northfield Park
 MGM Springfield
 The Mirage
 New York-New York Hotel and Casino
 The Park
 Park MGM
 Yonkers Raceway & Empire City Casino

References

External links

2016 initial public offerings
2022 mergers and acquisitions
American companies established in 2015
American companies disestablished in 2022
Companies based in Summerlin, Nevada
Companies formerly listed on the New York Stock Exchange
Defunct gambling companies
Gambling companies of the United States
MGM Resorts International
Real estate investment trusts of the United States